The Pit is a professional mixed martial arts association and training camp operating in Arroyo Grande, California; with a branch in Henderson, Nevada, and affiliate schools throughout the United States.  Founded in 1986 by John Hackleman, The Pit fighters have competed in various promotions such as the UFC, WEC and DREAM. The Pit became world famous when Pit black belt Chuck Liddell became the UFC light-heavyweight champion.

History
In 1986, The Pit was founded in Woodland Hills, California as a training gym teaching the art of Kajukenbo, which is now known as Hawaiian Kempo. Founder, John Hackleman started the school as a means to teach a more straight forward, no-nonsense approach to martial arts.  Initially, The Pit was intended for training serious fighters only and employed a logo depicting a Grim Reaper-like fighter. When The Pit opened to the general public, Hackleman renamed the school "KuZen" in order to attract kids and families. The Pit currently operates out of Arroyo Grande, California. It gained worldwide notoriety when Chuck Liddell became UFC Light-Heavyweight Champion.

The Pit boss

In 1985, Hackleman moved from Hawaii to California and renamed his martial arts style, Hawaiian Kempo. The Pit is the only Hawaiian Kempo school that uses the Ke-m-po spelling, instead of the more commonly used Ke-n-po.  Hackleman describes his style as more hardcore than other Hawaiian Kenpo schools. He gave his school the style name "KuZen," a word derived from mix "Ku," the Hawaiian god of war, and "Zen," for Zen Buddhism: this name was intended to attract children and families.

Training style
Hawaiian Kempo (a.k.a. Kajukenbo) blends kenpo, karate, judo, jiu-jitsu, boxing and wrestling. The Pit places a heavy emphasis on "CrossPit": The Pit's specialty strength and conditioning fitness program developed in the vein of CrossFit. In order to add more time for a fitness-oriented curriculum aimed at producing well-conditioned athletes, training katas were eliminated from the original KaJuKenBo formula. Practicality and usability are emphasized in the areas of striking and grappling. Bag training is emphasized both standing and on the ground.

Since the school began accepting non-fighters, they train students from ages three years and up. The school uses three separate belt systems; one for ages three to eight, nine through 13, and adults.

Notable fighters who have trained at The Pit

Chuck Liddell (UFC)
Tito Ortiz (UFC)
Jake Shields (UFC, Strikeforce)
Ramsey Nijem (UFC)
Tony DeSouza (UFC)
Bobby Southworth (Strikeforce)
Tim Kennedy (UFC, Strikeforce)
Jason Von Flue (UFC, Strikeforce)
Court McGee (UFC)
Scott Adams (UFC)
Glover Teixeira (UFC)
Steven Siler (UFC)
Antonio Banuelos (UFC, WEC, DREAM)
Scott Lighty (Strikeforce)

References

External links 
 The Pit Headquarters-Official Site
 The Pit Malibu
 The Pit North
 The Pit Instructionals
 [http://krfitcenter.com

Mixed martial arts training facilities
Arroyo Grande, California
1986 establishments in California